Quebec slang may refer to:

Quebec French lexicon 
Quebec French profanity